A central problem in algorithmic graph theory is the shortest path problem. One of the generalizations of the shortest path problem is known as the single-source-shortest-paths (SSSP) problem, which consists of finding the shortest path between every pair of vertices in a graph. There are classical sequential algorithms which solve this problem, such as Dijkstra's algorithm. In this article, however, we present two parallel algorithms solving this problem.

Another variation of the problem is the all-pairs-shortest-paths (APSP) problem, which also has parallel approaches: Parallel all-pairs shortest path algorithm.

Problem definition 
Let  be a directed graph with  nodes and  edges. Let  be a distinguished vertex (called "source") and  be a function assigning a non-negative real-valued weight to each edge. The weight of a path is the sum of the weights of its edges.

Tentative distances are improved by performing edge relaxations, i.e., for an edge   the algorithm sets .

For all parallel algorithms we will assume a PRAM model with concurrent reads and concurrent writes.

Delta stepping algorithm 
The delta stepping algorithm is a label-correcting algorithm, which means the tentative distance of a vertex can be corrected several times via edge relaxations until the last step of the algorithm, when all tentative distances are fixed.

The algorithm maintains eligible nodes with tentative distances in an array of buckets each of which represents a distance range of size . During each phase, the algorithm removes all nodes of the first nonempty bucket and relaxes all outgoing edges of weight at most . Edges of a higher weight are only relaxed after their respective starting nodes are surely settled. The parameter   is a positive real number that is also called the "step width" or "bucket width".

Parallelism is obtained by concurrently removing all nodes of the first nonempty bucket and relaxing their outgoing light edges in a single phase. If a node  has been removed from the current bucket  with non-final distance value then, in some subsequent phase,  will eventually be reinserted into  , and the outgoing light edges of   will be re-relaxed. The remaining heavy edges emanating from all nodes that have been removed from  so far are relaxed once and for all when  finally remains empty. Subsequently, the algorithm searches for the next nonempty bucket and proceeds as described above.

Also, the size of a path is defined to be the number of edges on the path.

Following is the delta stepping algorithm in pseudocode:
 1  foreach  do 
 2  ;                                                    (*Insert source node with distance 0*)
 3  while  do                                         (*A phase: Some queued nodes left (a)*)
 4                                          (*Smallest nonempty bucket (b)*)
 5                                                           (*No nodes deleted for bucket B[i] yet*)
 6      while  do                                           (*New phase (c)*)
 7                                     (*Create requests for light edges (d)*)
 8                                                      (*Remember deleted nodes (e)*)
 9                                                          (*Current bucket empty*)
 10                                              (*Do relaxations, nodes may (re)enter B[i] (f)*)
 11                                     (*Create requests for heavy edges (g)*)
 12                                               (*Relaxations will not refill B[i] (h)*)
 13
 14 function :set of Request
 15     return 
 16
 17 procedure 
 18     foreach  do 
 19
 20 procedure                                              (*Insert or move w in B if *)
 21     if  then
 22                               (*If in, remove from old bucket*)
 23                                          (*Insert into new bucket*)
 24

Example 

Following is a step by step description of the algorithm execution for a small example graph.

At the beginning of the algorithm, all vertices except for the source vertex A have infinite tentative distances.

Bucket  has range , bucket  has range  and bucket  has range .

The bucket  contains the vertex A. All other buckets are empty.

The vertices B,G and E are inserted into bucket . Since  is still empty, the heavy edge connecting A to D is also relaxed.

The vertex C is inserted into bucket . Since now  is empty, the heavy edge connecting E to F can be relaxed.

On the next step, the bucket  is examined, but doesn't lead to any modifications to the tentative distances.

The algorithm terminates.

Runtime 
As mentioned earlier,  is the maximum shortest path weight.

Let us call a path with total weight at most  and without edge repetitions a -path.

Let  denote the set of all node pairs  connected by some -path   and let .

The sequential delta-stepping algorithm needs at most operations. A simple parallelization runs in time  .

Graph 500 
The third computational kernel of the Graph 500 benchmark runs a single-source shortest path computation. The reference implementation of the Graph 500 benchmark uses the delta stepping algorithm for this computation.

Radius stepping algorithm 
For the radius stepping algorithm, we must assume that our graph  is undirected.

The input to the algorithm is a weighted, undirected graph, a source vertex, and a target radius value for every vertex, given as a function . The algorithm visits vertices in increasing distance from the source .

Following is the radius stepping algorithm in pseudocode:
     Input: A graph , vertex radii , and a source node .
  1  , 
  3  while  do
  4      
  5      repeat   
  6          foreach  s.t  do
  7              foreach  do
  8                  
  9      until no  was updated
  10     
  11     
  12 return 
For all , define  to be the neighbor set of S. During the execution of standard breadth-first search or Dijkstra's algorithm, the frontier is the neighbor set of all visited vertices.

In the Radius-Stepping algorithm, a new round distance  is decided on each round with the goal of bounding the number of substeps.

Vertices within  are then added to the visited set .

Example 

Following is a step by step description of the algorithm execution for a small example graph. The source vertex is the vertex A and the radius of every vertex is equal to 1.

The variable  is chosen to be equal to 4 and the neighbors of the vertices B, E and G are relaxed. 

The variable  is chosen to be equal to 6 and no values are changed. .

The variable  is chosen to be equal to 9 and no values are changed. .

The algorithm terminates.

Runtime 
In addition, the preprocessing phase takes   work and   depth, or  work and   depth.

References 

Graph algorithms